Denis Omerbegović (born 11 March 1986) is a Bosnian-Herzegovinian former professional footballer who played as a winger.

Career
Omerbegović was born in Zvornik. Before coming to Dortmund, he played on the second level of professional German football, 2. Bundesliga for LR Ahlen. After three years in Dortmund, he left and joined fourth division side SV Elversberg. In January 2011, he returned to the 2. Bundesliga.

On 8 June 2011, he signed for Romanian club Ceahlăul.

Personal life
Omerbegović also holds German citizenship.

References

External links
 
 

1986 births
Living people
People from Zvornik
Association football wingers
Bosnia and Herzegovina footballers
Rot Weiss Ahlen players
Borussia Dortmund II players
SV Elversberg players
Karlsruher SC players
CSM Ceahlăul Piatra Neamț players
FC Rapid Ghidighici players
2. Bundesliga players
Liga I players
Moldovan Super Liga players
Bosnia and Herzegovina expatriate footballers
Expatriate footballers in Germany
Bosnia and Herzegovina expatriate sportspeople in Germany
Expatriate footballers in Romania
Bosnia and Herzegovina expatriate sportspeople in Romania
Expatriate footballers in Moldova
Bosnia and Herzegovina expatriate sportspeople in Moldova